Melkoi Rural LLG is a local-level government (LLG) of East New Britain Province, Papua New Guinea.

Wards
01. Makmak
02. Waipo
03. Simi
04. Tavolo
05. Meletong
06. Uvol
07. Einahelei
08. Ruachana
09. Mininga
10. Maso
11. Esletenae
12. Mainge
13. Atu
14. Haumakia
15. Poio
16. Pilematana
17. Lausus
18. Kenmininga
19. Warale

References

Local-level governments of East New Britain Province